Hala may refer to:

People
 Hala (given name), a female given name (including a list of people and fictional characters with the name)
 David Hala (born 1989), Australian Rugby League player
 Hāla (fl. 20-24), Indian king of the Satavahana dynasty
 Hala Bashi, Uyghur Muslim general of the Ming dynasty and its Hongwu Emperor
 Jiří Hála (born 1972), Czech ice hockey player
 Martin Hála (born 1992), Czech footballer

Places
 Al Hala, a neighbourhood in Muharraq, Bahrain, also known as Halat Bu Maher
 Hala (Pakistan) railway station, a railway station in Hala, Sindh, Pakistan
 Hala railway station, a railway station in Inner Mongolia
 Hala, Sindh, a city in Sindh, Pakistan
 Hala Taluka, an administrative subdivision of Matiari District, Sindh, Pakistan
 Hala, Syria

Arts, entertainment, and media
 Hala (film), a 2019 film
 Hala, homeworld of an alien race known as the Kree in the Marvel Comics universe
 Hala the Accuser, a character from Marvel Comics
 HALA HALA (Hearts Awakened, Live Alive), a song by K-pop boy group Ateez

Other uses
 Al Hala SC, a football club based in Muharraq, Bahrain
 Ala (demon), a demon in Serbian and Bulgarian mythology
 Hala (spider), a genus of spider
 Pandanus tectorius, a tree and its eponymous edible fruit
 A word for "clan" in the Manchu language: cf. Manchu clans

See also
 Halas (disambiguation)
 Halla (disambiguation)